Christina Hendricks is an American actress whose accolades include six Primetime Emmy Award nominations, two Screen Actors Guild Awards, three Screen Actors Guild Award nominations, and two Critics' Choice Television Awards.

After appearing in several television series in the early 2000s, Hendricks had her breakthrough portraying Joan Holloway on the AMC series Mad Men, of which she remained a main cast member from its 2007 debut to its 2015 conclusion. During her tenure on the series, Hendricks was nominated for a Primetime Emmy Award for Outstanding Supporting Actress in a Drama Series six times. She also won two Screen Actors Guild Awards for Outstanding Performance by an Ensemble in a Drama Series, as well as an additional three nominations.

Additionally, Hendricks was nominated for two Golden Nymph Awards for her performance on Mad Men (one of which was a win). In 2018, she was nominated for a Satellite Award for her performance on the comedy series Good Girls.

Major associations

Primetime Emmy Awards
The Primetime Emmy Awards are bestowed by the Academy of Television Arts & Sciences (ATAS) in recognition of excellence in American primetime television programming.

Screen Actors Guild Awards
The Screen Actors Guild Awards are organized by the SAG-AFTRA. First awarded in 1995, the awards aim to recognize excellent achievements in film and television.

Miscellaneous awards

Critics' Choice Television Awards
The Critics' Choice Television Awards are presented annually since 2011 by the Broadcast Television Journalists Association. The awards were launched "to enhance access for broadcast journalists covering the television industry".

Golden Nymph Awards
The Golden Nymph Awards are presented annually by the Monte-Carlo Television Festival, and are among the "most prestigious prizes in international television, rewarding the best TV programs and actors".

Satellite Awards
The Satellite Awards are a set of annual awards given by the International Press Academy.

SyFy Genre Awards
The SyFy Genre Awards are presented annually by the SyFy channel, honoring film and television in the genre of science fiction.

TV Guide Awards
The TV Guide Awards are announced annually by TV Guide, based on readers' votes for their favorite performers in television.

Women Film Critics Circle
The Women Film Critics Circle is an association of 75 women film critics and scholars from around the country and internationally, who honor annual achievements by women film-makers.

Notes

References

Lists of awards received by American actor